Amédée Henri Gustave Noël Gastoué (19 March 1873 – 1 June 1943) was a French musicologist and composer.

Biography 
He also taught choral chant and Medieval music at the Institut catholique de Paris, the Collège Stanislas and the Lycée Montaigne. He was raised to the dignity of Commander of the Pontifical Order of Pope Gregory I by Pope Pius X.

Gastoué is the great-great-grandfather of Emmanuel Trenque, himself an organist and choral conductor.

Studies 
List according to the « Principaux ouvrages du même auteur » of Graduel et l'antiphonaire romains, histoire et description (fac-similé)
 Le Graduel et l'antiphonaire romains, histoire et description, Jeanin frères, Lyon 1913, 302 p. (fac-similé).
 Histoire du chant liturgique à Paris I, Dès origines à la fin des temps carolingiens, Poussielgue, Paris, 86 p.
 Cours théorique et pratique de plain-chant romain grégorien, Bureau de l'édition de la Schola cantorum, Paris 1904, 222 p.
 Les Origines du chant romain, l'Antiphonaire grégorien, Alphonse Picard & fils, Paris 1907
 Introduction à la Paléographie musicale byzantine; Catalogue des manuscrits de musique byzantine de la Bibliothèque nationale de Paris et des Bibliothèques publiques de France, Société internationale de musique et Geuthner, Paris 1907
 Nouvelle méthode pratique de chant grégorien, seule entièrement conforme à l'Édition vaticane, Lecoffre, Paris 1909.
 Traité d'harmonisation du chant grégorien, Janin frères, Lyon 1910, 130 p.
 L'Art grégorien, collection Maîtres de la musique, Alcan, Paris, 208 p.
 Musique et Apologétique : la Musique d'Église, Études historiques, esthétiques et pratiques, Janin frères, Lyon 1911, 284 p.

Musical work 
 Jeanne d'Arc, partition (récits, soli et chœurs, réduction de l'accompagnement au piano), légende en trois parties (Paris, Bonne Presse).
 Viviane, préludes et musique de scène (for the three-act drama by Georges Gourdon)
 Cantiques populaires, three series (Paris, Schola).
 Credo à quatre voix mixtes a cappella pour alterner avec le chant liturgique (same publisher)
 Petit Salut à deux voix égales et orgue, collection des Sclecla opéra.
 Messes et motets à plusieurs voix.

References

External links 
 Amédée Gastoué on Encyclopédie Larousse
 Amédée Gastoué Association des amis de l'orgue de Pibrac
 Amédée Gastoué / Henri de Villiers – Au sang qu’un Dieu va répandre on Liturgia
 Amédée GASTOUÉ on the site of the Académie française
 

20th-century French musicologists
20th-century French composers
Writers from Paris
1873 births
1943 deaths
Presidents of the Société française de musicologie